Seminole Hard Rock Hotel & Casino Tampa is a gaming complex and hotel that opened in 2004. It is located on the Tampa Reservation off of Interstate 4, just east of Tampa, Florida. The 190,000 square foot casino has been expanded multiple times since its opening. It is a 24-hour venue that permits smoking indoors.

It includes many displays of rock and roll memorabilia, such as clothing and musical instruments. Rock videos and music play on multiple screens, including one displayed inside a waterfall. Many song lyrics are displayed on the walls. Among its many services are a food court and tour bus parking. Special membership cards entitled "Seminole Wild Cards"  allow points accumulated by gambling to be redeemed for retail discounts, gambling playing credits, and other discounts and promotions.

History
In 1980, while excavating to build a parking garage in downtown Tampa, Indian remains were discovered. Taking advantage of reservation status, the tribe opened a museum, a smoke shop and a high-stakes bingo hall by 1982. Eventually a Four Points Sheraton Hotel opened on the land, and slot machines and poker were added to games offered. In 2000, the Seminoles announced plans to rebuild the casino as a Hard Rock Casino. The Hard Rock Casino opened in 2003, with the hotel opening the following year. Over time, the Florida Legislature has adopted laws allowing new games at the casino, including Vegas-style slot machines and blackjack. Major expansions of the casino occurred in 2007 and 2012, making it the largest in Florida.

Features
Aside from the casino, the hotel has a 12-story tower, a pool, a fitness center, and three parking garages. There are many restaurants, including the locally acclaimed Council Oak Steak House, The Fresh Harvest buffet, Rock and Raw sushi bar, The Rise Deli, JuBao Noodle Palace, an international food court, a large Hard Rock Cafe, which regularly hosts live stage performances, as well as others. For shopping there are multiple stores, including the Rain Maker tribal gift shop, the Hard Rock Store and a Seminole Smoke Shop. There are also multiple bars located around the casino floor, including the L Bar, the Center Bar and others. Additional features include a non-smoking game room and a high-rollers club room. Musical memorabilia exhibits can be found throughout the complex.

In 2019, a 14-story hotel tower was added to the property.

Casino
The 190,000+ square foot casino features over 5,000 Vegas-style slot machines and over 110 tables, encompassed within the complex. The grounds and surrounding parking garage structures combine Indian art and architecture together with art deco fixtures. These exterior features afford the casino a unique interior design and presence, that has specific attention to the display of Seminole art and tribal designs; many of which have been built into the various structures and can be seen among the many examples of Rock and Roll history, fame and memorabilia.

Security
The casino has state of the art security and surveillance systems throughout the complex that when combined with a highly trained staff helps ensure the safety
of the thousands of visitors and patrons who frequent the facility. Additionally extensive precautions have been undertaken to inform visitors and patrons in an effort to help prevent the dangers and damages associated with Problem gambling.

See also
List of casinos in Florida

Notes

References
Tampabay.com
Seminole Hard Rock Website
Tampabay.com

External links
 

Casinos completed in 2004
Hotel buildings completed in 2004
Hard Rock Cafe
Native American casinos
Seminole Tribe of Florida
Hotels in Tampa, Florida
Casinos in Florida
Tourist attractions in Tampa, Florida
Casino hotels
2004 establishments in Florida
The Cordish Companies
Native American history of Florida